The 1938–39 season was Chelsea Football Club's thirtieth competitive season. It was the last completed season of competitive football in England before the outbreak of the Second World War. The club finished the season 20th in The First Division, one point above the relegation zone. They also reached the quarter-finals of the FA Cup, a run which ended with a 1–0 home loss to Grimsby Town.

Table

References

External links
 1938–39 season at stamford-bridge.com

1938–39
English football clubs 1938–39 season